Countesthorpe railway station was a railway station serving Countesthorpe in Leicestershire.

In 1844 the Midland Counties joined the North Midland Railway and the Birmingham and Derby Junction Railway to form the Midland Railway.

British Railways closed the Leicester – Rugby line and its stations, including Countesthorpe which closed on 1 January 1962.

References

Railway stations in Great Britain opened in 1842
Railway stations in Great Britain closed in 1962
Former Midland Railway stations
Disused railway stations in Leicestershire
1842 establishments in England